Alibek Bekbayuly Kasym (Älıbek Bekbaiūly Qasym; born 27 May 1998) is a Kazakhstani footballer who plays as a defender for FC Aktobe and the Kazakhstan national team.

Career
Kasym made his professional debut with Akzhayik in a 5–3 Kazakhstan Cup win over FC Okzhetpes on 19 April 2018.

International career
Kasym made his international debut for the Kazakhstan national team in a friendly 4–0 win loss to North Macedonia on 4 June 2021.

References

External links
 
 
 Vesti Profile

1998 births
Living people
People from Oral, Kazakhstan
Kazakhstani footballers
Kazakhstan international footballers
Association football defenders
FC Kairat players
FC Kyzylzhar players
Kazakhstan Premier League players